Jere Elliott (born September 20, 1946 in Steamboat Springs, Colorado) is a former American alpine skier who competed in the 1968 Winter Olympics.

External links
 sports-reference.com
 

1946 births
Living people
American male alpine skiers
Olympic alpine skiers of the United States
Alpine skiers at the 1968 Winter Olympics
Sportspeople from Colorado
People from Steamboat Springs, Colorado